Eugene Young may refer to:
 Snooky Young (Eugene Edward Young), American jazz trumpeter
 Eugene Young (character), a character from the American legal drama The Practice
 Eugene S. Young, American diplomat
 Eugene "Scrapiron" Young, author, professional trainer, coach, and attorney
 E. F. Young Jr. (Eugene Fred Young Jr.), American businessman